Luis Alberto Machado (21 January 1932 – 23 February 2016) was a Venezuelan lawyer, author, Secretary of the Presidency and Minister of Intellectual Development of Venezuela. He was best known for his ideas about the malleability of intelligence.

Machado served as Secretary of the Presidency during Rafael Caldera's first Presidency (1969-1974).

He asserted, in his books and writings on the subject, that perceived limits on intelligence are false and are primarily tied to upbringing and social conditioning. He argued that through careful environmental stimulation, especially in the early stages of child development, intelligence can be developed indefinitely and exponentially throughout life.  As a politician, he stated that a nation's collective intellectual power was its greatest asset.

He was appointed Minister of Intellectual Development, a cabinet post created specifically for advancing and applying his ideas with government backing, during the presidency of Luis Herrera Campins (1979–1984). This program was known as the Intelligence Project, and, although given a small budget, resulted in a number of government initiatives aimed at improving educational opportunities in Venezuela.

The project was ended in 1984 by the government of president Jaime Lusinchi, but left behind a legacy in authors related to intelligence as Edward De Bono and his experience is cited by others as Martin Seligman, Howard Gardner and Robert Sternberg.

Publications
"UNIVERSAL GOAL" in Creating the Future: Perspectives on Educational Change. Compiled and Edited by Dee Dickinson.
Context "It Can be Done". In Context.

References 

1932 births
2016 deaths
Government ministers of Venezuela
Members of the Venezuelan Chamber of Deputies
Politicians from Caracas
20th-century Venezuelan lawyers